Public health laboratories (PHLs) are governmental reference laboratories that protect the public against diseases and other health hazards. The 2005 International Health Regulations came into force in June 2007, with 196 binding countries that recognised that certain public health incidents, extending beyond disease, ought to be designated as a Public Health Emergency of International Concern (PHEIC), as they pose a significant global threat. The PHLs serve as national hazard detection centres, and forward these concerns to the World Health Organization.

International accreditation
In 2007, Haim Hacham et al. published a paper addressing the need for and the process of international standardised accreditation for laboratory proficiency in Israel.  With similar efforts, both the Japan Accreditation Board for Conformity Assessment (JAB) and the European Communities Confederation of Clinical Chemistry and Laboratory Medicine (EC4) have validated and convened ISO 15189 Medical laboratories — Requirements for quality and competence, respectively.

In 2006, Spitzenberger and Edelhäuser expressed concerns that ISO accreditation may include obstacles arising from new emerging medical devices and the new approach of assessment; in so doing, they indicate the time dependence of standards.

Africa
 WHO-Afro HIV/AIDS Laboratory Network
 East African Laboratory Network
 African Society for Laboratory Medicine

Canada
 Canadian Public Health Laboratory Network

Europe
 European Union Reference Laboratories cf. Commission Regulation (EC) No 776/2006 and Commission Regulation (EC) No 882/2004
 EpiSouth Network

United Kingdom
The Public Health Laboratory Service (PHLS) was established as part of the National Health Service in 1946. An Emergency Public Health Laboratory Service was established in 1940 as a response to the threat of bacteriological warfare.  There was originally a central laboratory at Colindale and a network of regional and local laboratories. By 1955 there were about 1000 staff. These laboratories were primarily preventive with an epidemiological focus. They were, however, in some places located with hospital laboratories which had a diagnostic focus.

The PHLS was replaced by the Health Protection Agency in 2003; the HPA was disbanded and in its stead was constituted Public Health England, which later became the UK Health Security Agency in 2021.

United States
United States laboratory networks and organizations
 Association of Public Health Laboratories
 Laboratory Response Network (CDC)
 PulseNet (CDC)
 Integrated Consortium of Laboratory Networks 
 Food Emergency Response Network
 Environmental Laboratory Response Network
 Council to Improve Foodborne Outbreak Response

Other international laboratory networks
 WHO Global Influenza Surveillance and Response System
 WHO H5 Reference Laboratories
 WHO Emerging and Dangerous Pathogens Laboratory Network

See also
 Association of Public Health Laboratories
 ISO 9000
 ISO 15189
 ISO/IEC 17025

References

Clinical pathology
Laboratory types
Public health organizations
Public health emergencies of international concern